The Imamzadeh Shahreza is an Imamzadeh related to the Safavid dynasty and is located in Shahreza.

Sources 

Mosques in Iran
Religious buildings and structures with domes
National works of Iran
Safavid architecture